The Bird River is a tidal river in eastern Baltimore County in the U.S. state of Maryland. The Bird River empties into the Gunpowder River.

See also
List of Maryland rivers

References

External links
NOAA nautical chart 12274

Tributaries of the Chesapeake Bay
Rivers of Baltimore County, Maryland
Rivers of Maryland